Junius Marion Futrell (August 14, 1870 – June 20, 1955) was an American attorney who served as the 30th governor of Arkansas from 1933 to 1937, and the acting governor for a short period in  1913. He also served in the Arkansas House of Representatives and Arkansas Senate including as the senate president.

Early life
Futrell was born in Jones Ridge in Greene County in northeastern Arkansas to parents Jepthra and Arminia Levonica Eubanks Futrell. The second of three children, he attended the Arkansas Industrial University, now the University of Arkansas School of Law, from 1892 to 1893.  After his sophomore year, he taught school in several Arkansas counties until 1896, marrying Tera A. Smith on September 27, 1893. Futrell also farmed and worked in the timber industry before entering politics.

Career
Futrell was elected to the Arkansas House of Representatives and served from 1896 to 1904. He was elected Circuit Court Clerk from 1906 to 1910.

Futrell was elected to the Arkansas Senate and served from 1913 to 1917. He was the Senate President from 1915 to 1917. While President of the Senate, he served as acting governor for four months in 1913 after Governor Joseph Taylor Robinson resigned.

Futrell was admitted to the bar in Arkansas in 1913 and practiced law in Paragould until his 1922 appointment to the Second Division of the Second Circuit Court.  In 1923, he moved to the Twelfth Chancery Circuit.

Futrell was elected to a full term as governor in his own right in the 1932 election and reelected in 1934. In the 1932 general election, Futrell defeated the Republican J. O. Livesay, a lawyer from Foreman, who had also been the gubernatorial nominee against Harvey Parnell in 1930. Livesay finished the race with 8.9 percent of the vote, less than half his percent polled in 1930.

As governor, he opposed state funding for education beyond the eighth grade, believing the federal government should provide such support.

The Futrell administration established the Arkansas State Planning Board and created the Arkansas Department of Public Welfare. His administration also rescinded prohibition and instituted some legalized gambling.

After leaving office, Futrell returned to the practice of law.

Death
Futrell died in 1955 in Little Rock and is interred at Linwood Cemetery in Paragould. He had suffered a severe stroke on July 4, 1948.  Survivors included two sons and four daughters.

See also
List of governors of Arkansas

References

External links
 Old State House Museum

1870 births
1955 deaths
Acting Governors of Arkansas
Arkansas lawyers
Arkansas state court judges
Democratic Party Arkansas state senators
Democratic Party governors of Arkansas
Democratic Party members of the Arkansas House of Representatives
Farmers from Arkansas
People from Greene County, Arkansas
Schoolteachers from Arkansas
University of Arkansas School of Law alumni